Radič Branković was a 14th-century Serbian feudal lord of Braničevo under Dušan the Mighty of the Serbian Empire 

His family (House of Rastislalić) had gained possession of Braničevo in the 14th century. His father, Branko Rastislalić, was a Domestikos of Dušan the Mighty and was titled Lord of Podunavlje until his death in 1352, Radič succeeds him as Lord of Braničevo.

He issued his own regional currency, the "Helmet dinars" only one of three existing prior to the fall of the Serbian Empire.

In 1371 Moravian Serbia succeeds the central bulk of the Serbian Empire, his possessions are now under Lazar Hrebeljanović (Tsar Lazar of Serbia). He becomes a vassal of Hungary, and is supervised by Nicholas II Garay.

Tsar Lazar begins a military operation against Nikola Altomanovic, seizing his territory, sub-ordinating Radič to the north, successfully re-taking the region to the Serbian throne, he is finally evicted in 1379, hence ending the history of the Rastislalić house.

References

14th-century Serbian nobility
Rastislalić noble family